Statistics of Czechoslovak First League in the 1957–58 season.

Overview
It was contested by 12 teams, and Dukla Prague won the championship. Miroslav Wiecek was the league's top scorer with 25 goals.

Stadia and locations

League standings

Results

First and second round

Third round

Top goalscorers

References

Czechoslovakia - List of final tables (RSSSF)

Czechoslovak First League seasons
Czech
1957–58 in Czechoslovak football